René Spies (born 5 July 1973 in Winterberg, North Rhine-Westphalia) is a German bobsledder who competed from 1991 to 2006. He won a bronze medal in the two-man event at the 2003 FIBT World Championships in Lake Placid, New York.

Competing in two Winter Olympics, Spies earned his best finish of fifth in the four-man event at Turin in 2006.

His best finish in the Bobsleigh World Cup was second three times (Combined: 2002-3, Two-man: 2000-1, 2002-3).

Spies retired from bobsleigh to become a television commentator in Germany, but attempted to return to the German national team for the 2007-08 season without success. He announced his retirement from competition on November 1, 2007 which was announced on the FIBT website.

References

 2002 bobsleigh two-man results
 2006 bobsleigh four-man results
 Bobsleigh two-man world championship medalists since 1931
 FIBT profile (birthdate shown is incorrect)
 Official website 
 List of combined men's bobsleigh World Cup champions: 1985-2007
 List of two-man bobsleigh World Cup champions since 1985
 

1973 births
Living people
People from Winterberg
Sportspeople from Arnsberg (region)
German male bobsledders
Bobsledders at the 2002 Winter Olympics
Bobsledders at the 2006 Winter Olympics
Olympic bobsledders of Germany